Sabrin Burshid  (June 11 1985 – July 22 2019) was a Bahraini actress and broadcaster.

Biography
Burshid was born in Manama, Bahrain, to Saudi parents. She studied media and public relations, but left school in 2008 to work at the Bahrain Radio and Television Corporation. She made her television hosting debut in the summer of 2009. She presented a reality show for Ramadan 2010, winning the "Most Beautiful Arab Broadcaster" award, and was one of the hosts of the Kuwaiti show Ali Al-Seif on Al-Adalah TV.

Her first acting role was in the 2012 Eid al-Fitr play Misbah Zain; her friend Shaila Sabt helped her to obtain the role. In 2018, she moved to Kuwait for work-related reasons.

Illness and death
In April 2019, Burshid's family revealed that she was sleeping excessively and did not remember her friends’ names. Tests conducted at the Bahrain Defence Force Hospital revealed three lymphomas in the left hemisphere of her brain. This required immediate surgery and her father appealed to the King of Bahrain for aid in obtaining quick treatment, a plea that gained support from activists and artists across the Gulf.

The Royal Court agreed to send her abroad for treatment, and the Health Ministry arranged for her travel to Germany. However, her condition did not improve, and she died in Turkey on July 22, 2019.

Works

Television series

Theatre

Broadcasting

External links
 El Cinema page

References

1985 births
2019 deaths
Deaths from cancer in Turkey
Deaths from lymphoma
Bahraini expatriates in Kuwait
Bahraini television actresses
Bahraini television personalities
Bahraini people of Saudi Arabian descent